The Portrait of Cardinal Niccolò Albergati is a painting by early Netherlandish painter Jan van Eyck, dating to around 1431 and now in the Kunsthistorisches Museum of Vienna, Austria.

Niccolò Albergati was a diplomat working under Pope Martin V. During a peace congress in Antwerp, he met van Eyck, who portrayed him in a drawing in which the artist added notes on the colours in order to execute a later painting portrait. The drawing is now in the Staatliche Kunstsammlungen of Dresden, Germany.

The cardinal is portrayed from three-quarters, as was usual in Flemish painting since as early as the 1430s, on a dark background which enhances the figure, which is instead subject to a bright light source. As common in van Eyck's work, attention to detail is maximum, thanks to his technique using successive layers of colors diluted with oil, which allowed him deep effects of transparency and lucidity. Comparison with the preparatory drawing shows that van Eyck changed several realistic details, such as the depth of the shoulders, the lower curve of the nose, the depth of the mouth and mainly the size of the ear, perhaps to strengthen the impression of seniority and, consequently, of authority of the cardinal.

References
 Ainsworth, Maryan Wynn. From Van Eyck to Bruegel: Early Netherlandish Paintings in the Metropolitan Museum of Art. NY: Metropolitan Museum of Art, 2009. 
 Borchert, Till-Holger. Van Eyck. London: Taschen, 2008. 
 Conway, Martin. "A Head of Christ by John van Eyck". The Burlington Magazine for Connoisseurs, Volume 39, No. 225, December 1921
 Harbison, Craig. Jan van Eyck, The Play of Realism. London: Reaktion Books, 1991. 
 Otto Pächt. Van Eyck and the Founders of Early Netherlandish Painting. Harvey Miller, New York, 2000
 Schneider, Norbert. Jan van Eyck, the altar of Ghent: proposals for a reform of the church (in Spanish). 21st Century, 1997. 

1430s paintings
Portraits by Jan van Eyck
Albergati
Paintings in the collection of the Kunsthistorisches Museum
Portraits of men